This is a list of crime films released in 2004.

References

2000s
2004-related lists